Thomas Patrick Forrestal, Jr. (born October 23, 1936) is a former American football player. He grew up in Cleveland, Ohio, and attended St. Ignatius High School there.  He then enrolled at the United States Naval Academy where he played college football at the quarterback position for the Navy Midshipmen football team from 1955 to 1957. He was selected by the International News Service as a first-team player on its 1957 College Football All-America Team.

References

1936 births
Living people
American football quarterbacks
Navy Midshipmen football players
Players of American football from Cleveland